Wright Lower Glacier is a stagnant glacier occupying the mouth of Wright Valley and coalescing at its east side with Wilson Piedmont Glacier, in Victoria Land, Antarctica.

The glacier was originally called "Wright Glacier" by the British Antarctic Expedition (1910–13), for expedition member C.S. Wright. The name was adjusted decades later by the Victoria University of Wellington Antarctic Expedition (VUWAE) (1958–59), when the VUWAE also defined the name Wright Upper Glacier for the separate glacier at the head of Wright Valley.

Sources
USGS GNIS detail

Glaciers of the Asgard Range
McMurdo Dry Valleys